Benson Henderson (born November 16, 1983) is an American former professional mixed martial artist, who most recently competed in the Lightweight division for Bellator MMA. He is a former UFC Lightweight Champion and WEC Lightweight Champion.

Early life
Henderson was born in Colorado Springs, Colorado to a Korean mother and an African American father. Benson has an older brother, Julius, who was born in Korea. He was raised in Federal Way, Washington. When Henderson was approximately 9 years old, his mother, Song, insisted that he take Tae Kwon Do lessons with his brother. "She's Korean, I'm half-Korean, and it's the traditional Korean martial art, so she wanted us to do that to get a little bit of the culture and tradition," he says. Both Benson and his brother attained black belts in Tae Kwon Do.

He attended Decatur High School from 1998 to 2001. Benson became a part of the high school's wrestling team. After graduating from high school, he attended Dana College in Blair, Nebraska and graduated in 2006 with a double major in criminal justice and sociology. While attending Dana College, Henderson was on the wrestling team, and was twice named an NAIA All-American.

Mixed martial arts career
Henderson turned professional in 2006, winning his first match against Dan Gregary. He lost his third fight to Rocky Johnson via technical submission. However, this defeat was a minor setback. He rebounded with four straight wins before facing his toughest fight yet, against a UFC veteran, Diego Saraiva. Henderson came prepared as he dominated Saraiva for three rounds, winning a unanimous decision and his 7th professional win.

World Extreme Cagefighting

WEC Lightweight Championship
Three months later, Henderson made his World Extreme Cagefighting debut on January 25, 2009, at WEC 38 against Anthony Njokuani.  Henderson defeated Njokuani with a guillotine choke early in round two.

Henderson faced Shane Roller on April 5, 2009, at WEC 40.  Henderson won the bout via first-round TKO.

Interim WEC Lightweight Championship
Henderson was given an opportunity to fight for the Interim WEC Lightweight Championship against Donald Cerrone when lightweight champion Jamie Varner was unable to defend his title due to an injury. The fight took place on October 10, 2009, at WEC 43. Henderson won an exciting back-and-forth fight by unanimous decision.  Both Henderson and Cerrone were awarded with an additional purse of $20,000 for Fight of the Night. The bout was also awarded 2009 Fight of the Year for all of MMA by Sherdog.com

Undisputed WEC Lightweight Championship
Henderson faced Jamie Varner to unify the WEC Lightweight Championship at WEC 46 on January 10, 2010. After being outboxed and outwrestled in the first two rounds, Henderson came back and caught Varner in a standing guillotine choke ending the fight at 2:41 of the third round.

Henderson had his first title defense in a rematch with Donald Cerrone on April 24, 2010, at WEC 48. defeating Cerrone via guillotine choke in the first round. The win earned him a Submission of the Night bonus award.

Henderson faced Anthony Pettis on December 16, 2010, at WEC 53. Henderson lost his title by unanimous decision. The fight won Fight of the Night honors.

Ultimate Fighting Championship
In October 2010, World Extreme Cagefighting merged with the Ultimate Fighting Championship. As part of the merger, all WEC fighters were transferred to the UFC.

Henderson made his UFC debut at UFC 129 on April 30, 2011, where he faced Mark Bocek.  Henderson won the fight via unanimous decision.

Henderson next faced Jim Miller on August 14, 2011, at UFC on Versus 5.  Henderson dominated the streaking Miller throughout the fight, utilizing a stiff jab, great transitions, and vicious ground and pound throughout the match to snap Miller's 7 fight win streak, the third longest in the UFC at the time. Despite being threatened with multiple deep submission attempts, Henderson escaped each attempt and advanced position with increasingly brutal punches and elbows. He earned a unanimous decision (30-27, 29–28, 30–26).

Henderson faced Clay Guida on November 12, 2011, at UFC on Fox 1. He won the fight via unanimous decision after three rounds in an action packed war that earned both fighters Fight of the Night honors.  With the win, he became the #1 contender for the UFC Lightweight title.

UFC Lightweight Championship
Henderson faced Frankie Edgar on February 26, 2012, at UFC 144.  Henderson defeated Edgar via unanimous decision to become the new UFC Lightweight Champion. Both participants earned Fight of the Night honors for their performance.

A rematch with Edgar took place on August 11, 2012, at UFC 150. In a bout that was very tightly contested, Henderson defeated Edgar again, this time via split decision.

Henderson faced Nate Diaz on December 8, 2012, at UFC on Fox 5. Henderson punished Diaz with kicks, superior wrestling and ground and pound, Henderson knocked Diaz down twice with punches and was able to take his back on numerous occasions earning a unanimous decision victory.

Henderson faced the final Strikeforce Lightweight Champion, and promotional newcomer Gilbert Melendez on April 20, 2013, at UFC on Fox 7. Henderson won the fight by a closely contested split decision. After 3 consecutive wins to retain the title, Henderson tied BJ Penn with the highest number of title defenses as a lightweight.

Title loss and post title return

Henderson was expected to face T. J. Grant on August 31, 2013, at UFC 164. However, Grant was forced out of the bout with an injury, setting up a rematch with Anthony Pettis who defeated Henderson last time they fought via unanimous decision at the final WEC event, WEC 53. Pettis defeated Henderson via submission (armbar) in the first round. This is the second time Henderson lost his championship belt and title to Pettis.

In his first post-title loss fight, Henderson faced Josh Thomson on January 25, 2014, in the main event at UFC on Fox 10. Henderson defeated Thomson via split decision. He nearly became the first man to submit Thomson when he caught Thomson in a standing arm-triangle choke. Many media outlets and observers were split on who they thought should have been declared the winner. Thomson had one more takedown (5 to 4) and was able to secure Henderson's back on multiple occasions, while Henderson was able to significantly outstrike Thomson (114 to 33) over the duration of the bout and was credited with the bout's only submission attempt.

Henderson faced Rustam Khabilov on June 7, 2014, in the main event at UFC Fight Night: Henderson vs. Khabilov. He won the fight via rear-naked choke submission in the fourth round. The win also earned Henderson his first Performance of the Night bonus award.

Henderson headlined UFC Fight Night 49 against Rafael dos Anjos on August 23, 2014. He lost the fight via knockout in the first round.

Henderson was scheduled to fight Eddie Alvarez on January 18, 2015, at UFC Fight Night 59.  However, Alvarez pulled out of the fight in early January due to illness, and was replaced by Donald Cerrone in a rematch. Henderson lost the fight via a controversial unanimous decision. 12 of 14 media outlets scored the bout in favor of Henderson.

Switching weight classes

Henderson decided to make the move up to welterweight after a spot became available at UFC Fight Night 60 with Brandon Thatch on February 14, 2015, in the event headliner at UFC Fight Night 60, where he replaced an injured Stephen Thompson.  Henderson won the back and forth fight via submission in the fourth round.  Their performance earned both participants Fight of the Night honors. Henderson was expected to face Bobby Green in his second Welterweight bout, but Bobby Green pulled out due to injury, so Henderson faced Jorge Masvidal on April 4, 2015, at UFC Fight Night 63.

A bout with Michael Johnson was initially linked as the event headliner for The Ultimate Fighter 21 Finale on July 12, 2015.  Although never officially announced by the UFC, the bout between Henderson and Johnson will not take place at this event.  Subsequently, Henderson revealed his intentions to return, at least temporarily, to the welterweight division and targeted a return date of November 2015 and a possible appearance on the UFC's inaugural event in Seoul.

Henderson was expected to face Thiago Alves on November 28, 2015, at UFC Fight Night 79. However, on November 14, 2015, Alves pulled out the bout citing injury and was replaced by Jorge Masvidal. Henderson won the back-and-forth fight via split decision.

Bellator MMA

On February 1, 2016, Henderson announced that he had signed with Bellator MMA. In his debut, he faced Andrey Koreshkov on April 22, 2016, at Bellator 153 for the Bellator Welterweight Championship. Henderson lost the fight by unanimous decision.

Title contention and title shot
For his second fight with the promotion, Henderson made his return to the lightweight division to fight Patrício Pitbull in the main event at Bellator 160 on August 26, 2016. The bout ended in anticlimactic fashion as Pitbull stopped himself early in round two to declare he had sustained a leg injury. As a result, Henderson was awarded a TKO victory due to injury and earned a title shot against Michael Chandler. It was revealed post-fight that Freire had broken his shin in the first round after Henderson checked a low kick with his knee.

On August 31, 2016, it was announced that Henderson would challenge Michael Chandler for the Bellator Lightweight Championship on November 19, 2016, at Bellator 165. Henderson lost the back-and-forth bout via split decision.

Post-title shot reign
Henderson faced Patricky Pitbull at Bellator 183 on September 23, 2017. He lost the fight via split decision.

Henderson faced returning Bellator veteran Roger Huerta in the main event at Bellator 196 on April 6, 2018. He won the fight via submission in the second round.

Henderson faced Saad Awad at Bellator 208 on October 13, 2018. He won the fight by unanimous decision.

In November 2018, Bellator officials revealed that Henderson had signed a new exclusive, long-term contract with Bellator.

Henderson next faced Adam Piccolotti at Bellator 220 on April 27, 2019. He won the fight via split decision. 8 out of 9 media scores gave it to Piccolotti.

Henderson faced Bellator newcomer Myles Jury in the headliner of Bellator 227 on September 27, 2019. He won the fight by unanimous decision.

On October 25, 2019, it was announced that Henderson would next rematch Michael Chandler at Bellator & Rizin: Japan on December 29, 2019. However, Henderson was forced to withdraw from the bout citing an injury and was replaced by Sidney Outlaw. The rematch was rescheduled to take place at Bellator 244 on June 6, 2020. However, the event was postponed due to the COVID-19 pandemic. The rematch eventually took place on August 7, 2020, at Bellator 243. Henderson lost the fight via knockout in the first round.

Henderson then moved up to Welterweight to face Jason Jackson on November 28, 2020 at Bellator 253. Jackson controlled a majority of the fight, winning via unanimous decision in an upset victory.

Henderson faced Brent Primus on October 16, 2021, at Bellator 268. He lost the fight via unanimous decision.

Henderson faced Islam Mamedov on January 29, 2022, at Bellator 273. He won the back-and-forth fight via split decision, ending a three-fight losing streak in what was his last fight on his prevailing contract.

On March 23, 2022, it was announced that Henderson had signed a new multi-fight contract with Bellator.

Henderson faced Peter Queally on September 23, 2022 at Bellator 285. He won the fight by unanimous decision.

Lightweight Grand Prix 
Being announced as one of the participants of the $1 million Lightweight Grand Prix, in the quarterfinals, Henderson faced reigning champion Usman Nurmagomedov for the Bellator Lightweight World Championship on March 10, 2023 at Bellator 292. He lost the fight via rear-naked choke submission in the first round, and subsequently announced his retirement during the post-fight interview.

Professional grappling career
Henderson competed against fellow MMA veteran Ben Saunders in a superfight at UFC Fight Pass Invitational 1 on December 16, 2021 and won the match by unanimous decision. He then faced Demian Maia in the main event of Polaris 20 on June 25, 2022, losing the match by unanimous decision.

Personal life 
Henderson is a Christian and often refers to his faith in post-fight interviews. He has three sons and a daughter  – Kyong, Kub and Koah – with his wife, Maria. Henderson proposed to his fiancée in the Octagon after his win over Gilbert Melendez at UFC on Fox 7.

Championships and accomplishments

Mixed martial arts
Ultimate Fighting Championship
UFC Lightweight Championship (One time; former)
 Three successful title defenses
Tied with B.J. Penn, Frankie Edgar and Khabib Nurmagomedov for the most consecutive Lightweight title defenses in UFC history - (3)
Unified the UFC Lightweight and Strikeforce Lightweight Championships
Fight of the Night (Three times) 
Performance of the Night (One time) 
World Extreme Cagefighting
WEC Lightweight Championship (One time; former)
 One successful title defense
Interim WEC Lightweight Championship (One time; former)
Fight of the Night (Two times) 
Submission of the Night (One time) 
ESPN
2012 Fighter of the Year
2012 Fight of the Year vs. Frankie Edgar at UFC 144
2015 Best Fight of the Half-Year vs. Brandon Thatch
Inside MMA
2012 Fighter of the Year Bazzie Award
MMAWeekly.com
2012 Fighter of the Year
FightMatrix.com
2012 Fighter of the Year
MMAFighting.com
2010 Fight of the Year vs. Anthony Pettis on December 16
2009 Fight of the Year vs. Donald Cerrone on October 10
USA Today
2010 Fight of the Year vs. Anthony Pettis on December 16
Sports Illustrated
2009 Fight of the Year vs. Donald Cerrone on October 10
Sherdog
2012 Fighter of the Year
2009 Fight of the Year vs. Donald Cerrone on October 10

Submission grappling
International Brazilian Jiu-Jitsu Federation
2011 World Jiu-Jitsu Championship Brown Belt Bronze Medalist
2014 World Jiu Jitsu No-Gi Championship Black Belt Bronze Medalist
Arizona State Brazilian Jiu-Jitsu Federation
AZSBJJF MVP of the Year (2010)
Arizona State Championship Brown Belt Middleweight Gold Medalist (Two times)
Arizona State Championship Purple Belt Middleweight Gold Medalist (Two times)
Arizona State Championship Openweight Gold Medalist (Three times)

Amateur wrestling
National Association of Intercollegiate Athletics
NAIA All-American (2005, 2006)
Washington Interscholastic Activities Association
WIAA 4A High School State Championship Runner-up (2001)
WIAA 4A All-State (2001)

Mixed martial arts record

|-
|Loss
|align=center|30–12
|Usman Nurmagomedov
|Submission (rear-naked choke)
|Bellator 292
|
|align=center|1
|align=center|2:37
|San Jose, California, United States
|
|-
|Win
|align=center| 30–11
|Peter Queally 
|Decision (unanimous)
|Bellator 285
|
|align=center| 5
|align=center| 5:00
|Dublin, Ireland
|
|-
|Win
|align=center|29–11
|Islam Mamedov
|Decision (split)
|Bellator 273
|
|align=center|3
|align=center|5:00
|Phoenix, Arizona, United States
|
|-
|Loss
|align=center|28–11
|Brent Primus
|Decision (unanimous)
|Bellator 268 
|
|align=center|3
|align=center|5:00
|Phoenix, Arizona, United States 
|
|-
|Loss
|align=center|28–10
|Jason Jackson
|Decision (unanimous)
|Bellator 253
|
|align=center|3
|align=center|5:00
|Uncasville, Connecticut, United States
|
|-
|Loss
|align=center|28–9
|Michael Chandler
|KO (punches)
|Bellator 243
|
|align=center|1
|align=center|2:09
|Uncasville, Connecticut, United States
|
|-
|Win
|align=center|28–8
|Myles Jury
|Decision (unanimous)
|Bellator 227
|
|align=center|3
|align=center|5:00
|Dublin, Ireland
|
|-
|Win
|align=center|27–8
|Adam Piccolotti
|Decision (split)
|Bellator 220
|
|align=center|3
|align=center|5:00
|San Jose, California, United States
|
|-
|Win
|align=center|26–8
|Saad Awad
| Decision (unanimous)
|Bellator 208
|
|align=center|3
|align=center|5:00
|Uniondale, New York, United States
|
|-
|Win
|align=center|25–8
|Roger Huerta
| Submission (guillotine choke)
|Bellator 196
|
|align=center|2
|align=center|0:49
|Budapest, Hungary
|
|-
|Loss
|align=center|24–8
|Patricky Pitbull
| Decision (split)
|Bellator 183
|
|align=center|3
|align=center|5:00
|San Jose, California, United States
|
|-
|Loss
|align=center|24–7
|Michael Chandler
| Decision (split)
|Bellator 165
|
|align=center|5
|align=center|5:00
|San Jose, California, United States
|
|-
|Win
|align=center|24–6
|Patrício Pitbull
| TKO (leg injury)
|Bellator 160
|
|align=center|2
|align=center|2:26
|Anaheim, California, United States
|
|-
|Loss
|align=center|23–6
|Andrey Koreshkov
|Decision (unanimous)
|Bellator 153
|
|align=center|5
|align=center|5:00
|Uncasville, Connecticut, United States
|
|-
|Win
|align=center| 23–5
|Jorge Masvidal
|Decision (split)
|UFC Fight Night: Henderson vs. Masvidal
|
|align=center|5
|align=center|5:00
|Seoul, South Korea
|
|-
| Win
| align=center| 22–5
| Brandon Thatch
| Submission (rear-naked choke)
| UFC Fight Night: Henderson vs. Thatch
| 
| align=center| 4
| align=center| 3:58
| Broomfield, Colorado, United States
| 
|-
| Loss
| align=center| 21–5
| Donald Cerrone
| Decision (unanimous)
| UFC Fight Night: McGregor vs. Siver
| 
| align=center| 3
| align=center| 5:00
| Boston, Massachusetts, United States
|
|-
| Loss
| align=center| 21–4
| Rafael dos Anjos
| KO (punch)
| UFC Fight Night: Henderson vs. dos Anjos
| 
| align=center| 1
| align=center| 2:31
| Tulsa, Oklahoma, United States
|
|-
| Win
| align=center| 21–3
| Rustam Khabilov
| Submission (rear-naked choke)
| UFC Fight Night: Henderson vs. Khabilov
| 
| align=center| 4
| align=center| 1:16
| Albuquerque, New Mexico, United States
| 
|-
| Win
| align=center| 20–3
| Josh Thomson
| Decision (split)
| UFC on Fox: Henderson vs. Thomson
| 
| align=center| 5
| align=center| 5:00
| Chicago, Illinois, United States
|
|-
| Loss
| align=center| 19–3
| Anthony Pettis
| Submission (armbar)
| UFC 164
| 
| align=center| 1
| align=center| 4:31
| Milwaukee, Wisconsin, United States
| 
|-
| Win
| align=center| 19–2
| Gilbert Melendez
| Decision (split)
| UFC on Fox: Henderson vs. Melendez
| 
| align=center| 5
| align=center| 5:00
| San Jose, California, United States
| 
|-
| Win
| align=center| 18–2
| Nate Diaz
| Decision (unanimous)
| UFC on Fox: Henderson vs. Diaz
| 
| align=center| 5
| align=center| 5:00
| Seattle, Washington, United States
| 
|-
| Win
| align=center| 17–2
| Frankie Edgar
| Decision (split)
| UFC 150
| 
| align=center| 5
| align=center| 5:00
| Denver, Colorado, United States
| 
|-
| Win
| align=center| 16–2
| Frankie Edgar
| Decision (unanimous)
| UFC 144
| 
| align=center| 5
| align=center| 5:00
| Saitama, Japan
| 
|-
| Win
| align=center| 15–2
| Clay Guida
| Decision (unanimous)
| UFC on Fox: Velasquez vs. dos Santos
| 
| align=center| 3
| align=center| 5:00
| Anaheim, California, United States
| 
|-
| Win
| align=center| 14–2
| Jim Miller
| Decision (unanimous)
| UFC Live: Hardy vs. Lytle
| 
| align=center| 3
| align=center| 5:00
| Milwaukee, Wisconsin, United States
|
|-
| Win
| align=center| 13–2
| Mark Bocek
| Decision (unanimous)
| UFC 129
| 
| align=center| 3
| align=center| 5:00
| Toronto, Ontario, Canada
|
|-
| Loss
| align=center| 12–2
| Anthony Pettis
| Decision (unanimous)
| WEC 53
| 
| align=center| 5
| align=center| 5:00
| Glendale, Arizona, United States
| 
|-
| Win
| align=center| 12–1
| Donald Cerrone
| Submission (guillotine choke)
| WEC 48
| 
| align=center| 1
| align=center| 1:57
| Sacramento, California, United States
| 
|-
| Win
| align=center| 11–1
| Jamie Varner
| Submission (guillotine choke)
| WEC 46
| 
| align=center| 3
| align=center| 2:41
| Sacramento, California, United States
| 
|-
| Win
| align=center| 10–1
| Donald Cerrone
| Decision (unanimous)
| WEC 43
| 
| align=center| 5
| align=center| 5:00
| San Antonio, Texas, United States
| 
|-
| Win
| align=center| 9–1
| Shane Roller
| TKO (punches)
| WEC 40
| 
| align=center| 1
| align=center| 1:41
| Chicago, Illinois, United States
|
|-
| Win
| align=center| 8–1
| Anthony Njokuani
| Submission (guillotine choke)
| WEC 38
| 
| align=center| 2
| align=center| 0:42
| San Diego, California, United States
|
|-
| Win
| align=center| 7–1
| Diego Saraiva
| Decision (unanimous)
| Evolution MMA
| 
| align=center| 3
| align=center| 5:00
| Phoenix, Arizona, United States
|
|-
| Win
| align=center| 6–1
| Ricardo Tirloni
| Submission (guillotine choke)
| MFC 17: Hostile Takeover
| 
| align=center| 2
| align=center| 3:49
| Edmonton, Alberta, Canada
|
|-
| Win
| align=center| 5–1
| Mike Maestas
| Submission (rear-naked choke)
| MFC 16: Anger Management
| 
| align=center| 3
| align=center| 4:11
| Edmonton, Alberta, Canada
|
|-
| Win
| align=center| 4–1
| Bryan Corley
| Submission (rear-naked choke)
| Victory FC 21: Infamous
| 
| align=center| 1
| align=center| 2:36
| Council Bluffs, Iowa, United States
|
|-
| Win
| align=center| 3–1
| David Dagloria
| TKO (submission to punches)
| Ultimate Combat Experience: Round 26: Episode 12
| 
| align=center| 1
| align=center| 1:45
| Ogden, Utah, United States
|
|-
| Loss
| align=center| 2–1
| Rocky Johnson
| Technical Submission (anaconda choke)
| Battlequest 5: Avalanche
| 
| align=center| 1
| align=center| 0:46
| Vail, Colorado, United States
| 
|-
| Win
| align=center| 2–0
| Allen Williams
| TKO (punches)
| Victory FC 18: Hitmen
| 
| align=center| 1
| align=center| 1:37
| Council Bluffs, Iowa, United States
|
|-
| Win
| align=center| 1–0
| Dan Gregary
| TKO (submission to punches)
| Midwest Championship Fighting: Genesis
| 
| align=center| 1
| align=center| 4:21
| North Platte, Nebraska, United States
|

Pay-per-view bouts

See also
 List of male mixed martial artists

References

External links
 
 
 
 
 Ben Henderson Quotes

African-American mixed martial artists
American male mixed martial artists
American sportspeople of Korean descent
American practitioners of Brazilian jiu-jitsu
People awarded a black belt in Brazilian jiu-jitsu
American male taekwondo practitioners
American submission wrestlers
American male sport wrestlers
Amateur wrestlers
Mixed martial artists from Colorado
Mixed martial artists from Washington (state)
Lightweight mixed martial artists
Mixed martial artists utilizing taekwondo
Mixed martial artists utilizing collegiate wrestling
Mixed martial artists utilizing Brazilian jiu-jitsu
Ultimate Fighting Championship champions
World Extreme Cagefighting champions
1983 births
Living people
People from Federal Way, Washington
Sportspeople from Phoenix, Arizona
Dana College alumni
American Christians
Bellator male fighters
Ultimate Fighting Championship male fighters
21st-century African-American sportspeople
20th-century African-American people